Brinkley may refer to:

People
 Brinkley (surname)

Places
 Brinkley, Arkansas, USA
 Brinkley, Nottinghamshire, England
 Brinkley, Cambridgeshire, England

Fictional places 
 Brinkley Court, the seat of Dahlia Travers and her husband Tom in the novels and stories of P. G. Wodehouse